Bedtime Tales (Beddo no otogibanashi) (1987) is a collection of short stories published in 1987 by Japanese author Yoko Mori. The collection was translated by Sonya L. Johnson and was published by Kodansha under the Kodansha English Library series in 1993.

Themes
The stories follow the same themes used in Mori's later works and follow the lives of Japanese women living in a male dominated Japan.

Stories
Sudden Shower - The 1st Night
Credit Card - The 2nd Night
Bloody Mary - The 3rd Night
The Thirteenth Hour - The 4th Night
Women Friends - The 6th Night
Office Love - The 8th Night
Christmas Eve - The 13th Night
The Jade Earrings - The 15th Night
The Woman in the Mirror - The 23rd Night
A Call in the Night - The 24th Night
The Thorn in the Rose - The 28th Night
Home, Sweet Home - The 31st Night

Sequel
Beddo no otogibanashi Part II was published in 1989 and is also another collection of short stories.

References

External links
 https://web.archive.org/web/20110514002639/http://www.iblist.com/author7086.htm

Japanese short stories